Amphorateuthis alveatus is a species of bobtail squid native to the Indian Ocean. It is characterised by unique modifications of the arms in males; mature males exhibit elongate suckers in numerous series on arm pairs II and IV.

A. alveatus is known from only four specimens. Paratype no. 3 was caught at virtually the same locality in a 40 ft bottom trawl that fished to a depth of 100 m.

References

External links
Tree of Life web project: Amphorateuthis alveatus

Bobtail squid
Molluscs described in 2007
Monotypic mollusc genera